Cropp or CROPP may refer to
Cropp (surname)
Cropp River in New Zealand
Cropp, Virginia, an unincorporated community in the United States
Coulee Region Organic Produce Pool, former name of Organic Valley, a cooperative of organic farmers based in Wisconsin, United States
Cropp, a Polish clothing brand